In business, a corporate raid is the process of buying a large stake in a corporation and then using shareholder voting rights to require the company to undertake novel measures designed to increase the share value, generally in opposition to the desires and practices of the corporation's current management. The measures might include replacing top executives, downsizing operations, or liquidating the company.

Corporate raids were particularly common between the 1970s and the 1990s in the United States. By the end of the 1980s, management of many large publicly traded corporations had adopted legal countermeasures designed to thwart potential hostile takeovers and corporate raids, including poison pills, golden parachutes, and increases in debt levels on the company's balance sheet. In later years, some corporate raiding practices have been used by "activist shareholders", who purchase equity stakes in a corporation to influence its board of directors and put public pressure on its management.

History

Corporate raids became a hallmark of investors in the 1970s and 1980s, particularly highlighted by the public suicide of Eli Black. Among the most notable corporate raiders of the 1970s and 1980s were Louis Wolfson, Carl Icahn, Victor Posner, Meshulam Riklis, Nelson Peltz, Robert M. Bass, T. Boone Pickens, Paul Bilzerian, Harold Clark Simmons, Kirk Kerkorian, Sir James Goldsmith, Saul Steinberg and Asher Edelman. These investors used a number of the same tactics and targeted the same type of companies as more traditional leveraged buyouts and in many ways could be considered a forerunner of the later private equity firms. In fact it is Posner, one of the first "corporate raiders" who is often credited with coining the term "leveraged buyout" or "LBO".

Victor Posner, who had made a fortune in real estate investments in the 1930s and 1940s, acquired a major stake in DWG Corporation in 1966. Having gained control of the company, he used it as an investment vehicle that could execute takeovers of other companies. Posner and DWG are perhaps best known for the hostile takeover of Sharon Steel Corporation in 1969, one of the earliest such takeovers in the United States. Posner's investments were typically motivated by attractive valuations, balance sheets and cash flow characteristics. Because of its high debt load, Posner's DWG generated attractive but highly volatile returns and ultimately landed in financial difficulty. In 1987, Sharon Steel entered Chapter 11 bankruptcy protection.

Carl Icahn developed a reputation as a ruthless "corporate raider" after his hostile takeover of TWA in 1985. The result of that takeover was Icahn systematically selling TWA's assets to repay the debt he used to purchase the company, which was described as "asset stripping".

Icahn also attempted the grand prize of U.S. Steel, launching a hostile takeover for 89% of the industrial giant for $7 billion ($ billion today) in late 1986 and only being rebuffed finally by CEO David Roderick on January 8, 1987.

T. Boone Pickens' hostile takeover bid of Gulf Oil in 1984 led to shock that such a large company could be raided. Gulf eventually sold out to Chevron for a then-record $13.3 billion ($ billion today) "white knight" buyout.

Paul Bilzerian launched a number of takeover bids including Cluett Peabody & Company, Hammermill Paper Company, Pay n Pack Stores, Allied Stores and the Singer Corporation.  All of his takeover bids were for all cash and for all shares and he refused any greenmail.  Bilzerian was indicted for Schedule13(d) disclosure violations and despite his claims of innocence he was convicted in 1989.  After spending thirty years fighting the government in his attempt to overturn his conviction, he renounced his US citizenship in 2019.

British raider Beazer also launched several successful hostile takeovers in the 1980s, the largest being that of Koppers in early 1988 for $1.81 billion ($ billion today).

Many of the corporate raiders of the 1980s were onetime clients of Michael Milken, whose investment banking firm, Drexel Burnham Lambert helped raise blind pools of capital which corporate raiders could use to make legitimate attempts to take over companies and provide high-yield debt financing of the buyouts.

Ronald Perelman and Revlon
Drexel Burnham raised a $100 million blind pool in 1984 for Nelson Peltz and his holding company Triangle Industries (later Triarc) to give credibility for takeovers, representing the first major blind pool raised for this purpose. Two years later, in 1986, Wickes Companies, a holding company run by Sanford Sigoloff, would raise a $1.2 billion blind pool. In later years, Milken and Drexel would shy away from certain of the more "notorious" corporate raiders as the firm and the private equity industry attempted to move upscale.

In 1985, Milken raised $750 million for a similar blind pool for Ronald Perelman, which would ultimately prove instrumental in acquiring his biggest target: The Revlon Corporation. In 1980, Ronald Perelman, the son of a wealthy Philadelphia businessman, and future "corporate raider", having made several small but successful buyouts, acquired MacAndrews & Forbes, a distributor of licorice extract and chocolate, which Perelman's father had tried and failed to acquire 10 years earlier. Perelman would ultimately divest the company's core business and use MacAndrews & Forbes as a holding company investment vehicle for subsequent leveraged buyouts including Technicolor, Inc., Pantry Pride and Revlon. Using the Pantry Pride subsidiary of his holding company, MacAndrews & Forbes Holdings, Perelman's overtures were rebuffed. Repeatedly rejected by the company's board and management, Perelman continued to press forward with a hostile takeover, raising his offer from an initial bid of $47.50 per share until it reached $53.00 per share. After Revlon received a higher offer from a white knight, private equity firm Forstmann Little & Company, Perelman's Pantry Pride finally was able to make a successful bid for Revlon, valuing the company at $2.7 billion.  The buyout would prove troubling, burdened by a heavy debt load. Under Perelman's control, Revlon sold 4 divisions: two were sold for $1 billion, its vision care division was sold for $574 million, and its National Health Laboratories division was spun out to the public market in 1988.  Revlon also made acquisitions including Max Factor in 1987 and Betrix in 1989, later selling them to Procter & Gamble in 1991. Perelman exited the bulk of his holdings in Revlon through an IPO in 1996 and subsequent sales of stock. As of December 31, 2007, Perelman still retains a minority ownership interest in Revlon. The Revlon takeover, because of its well-known brand, was profiled widely by the media and brought new attention to the emerging boom in leveraged buyout activity.  Litigation associated with the takeover has also become standard reading for introductory business organization classes in most law schools, introducing what have come to be known as "Revlon duties" for boards of companies that are up for auction.

Decline of the corporate raiders

In the late 1980s several famous corporate raiders suffered from bad investments financed by large amounts of leverage, ultimately losing money for their investors. Additionally, with the fall of Michael Milken and the subsequent collapse of Drexel Burnham Lambert, the credit lines for these investors dried up. By the end of the decade, management of many large publicly traded corporations reacted negatively to the threat of potential hostile takeover or corporate raid and pursued drastic defensive measures including poison pills, golden parachutes and increasing debt levels on the company's balance sheet. Finally, in the 1990s the overall price of the American stock market increased, which reduced the number of situations in which a company's share price was low with respect to the assets that it controlled. By the end of the 1990s, the corporate raider moniker was used less frequently as private equity firms pursued different tactics than their predecessors. In later years, many of the corporate raiders would be re-characterized as "activist shareholders", such as Carl Icahn during his 2008 profile on CBS's 60 Minutes.

Media reflections of corporate raiders

Although private equity rarely received a thorough treatment in popular culture, several films did feature stereotypical "corporate raiders" prominently. Among the most notable examples of private equity featured in motion pictures included:
 Gordon Gekko, Wall Street (1987) and Wall Street: Money Never Sleeps (2010) – The notorious "corporate raider" and greenmailer, Gordon Gekko (played by Michael Douglas), represents a synthesis of the worst features of various famous private equity figures. In the film, the character intends to manipulate an ambitious young stockbroker to take over a failing, but decent, airline. Although Gekko makes a pretense of caring about the airline, his intentions prove to be to destroy the airline, strip its assets and lay off its employees before raiding the corporate pension fund. Gekko would become a symbol in popular culture for unrestrained greed (with the signature line, "Greed, for lack of a better word, is good") that would be attached to the private equity industry. Sir Lawrence Wildman, based on Sir James Goldsmith also appears in Wall Street.
 Larry the Liquidator, Other People's Money (1990) – A self-absorbed corporate raider "Larry the Liquidator" (Danny DeVito), sets his sights on New England Wire and Cable, a small-town business run by family patriarch (Gregory Peck) who is principally interested in protecting his employees and the town. Larry ultimately wins over the shareholders when he admits he did not cause the company to fail; rather it was making outmoded equipment, using the analogy of 19th Century buggy whip makers who failed to realize they were being superseded by the automobile.
 Edward Lewis, Pretty Woman (1990) – Corporate raider Edward Lewis (Richard Gere) attempts to make a hostile takeover of Morse Industries. Edward explains what he does for a living to Vivian (Julia Roberts): he buys large companies that are on the verge of bankruptcy, breaks them up and sells them in smaller parts, at a price that's more than the whole company, for profit.
 Devin Weston, Grand Theft Auto V (2013) – Weston is initially presented as a self-made billionaire who made his fortune as a venture capitalist. In reality, he is a corporate raider who finds loopholes in legal contracts that he uses to strip companies of their assets simply because he can, and because he enjoys knowing that his victims can do nothing to stop him. Over the course of the game, he attempts to force the Richards Majestic film studio into bankruptcy by sabotaging production of a major film, leaving the owners with no choice but to sell their stake in the company to him. Once he has a majority shareholding (and after collecting the insurance on the film), he plans to tear the studios down and build luxury apartments in their place. The player is able to prevent this from happening by retrieving the film stolen by Weston, but this causes Weston to harbour a grudge against the player character, and he becomes one of the primary antagonists of the game. If the player chooses Ending C, Weston is killed along with the other three antagonists.

References

Further reading
.

Mergers and acquisitions
Private equity
Capitalism